SSRC may refer to:
Social Science Research Center (MSU), a research institution at Mississippi State University
Social Science Research Council, an independent research organization based in New York City
Social Science Research Council, former name of the Economic and Social Research Council, one of the United Kingdom's eight Research Councils
Scientific Studies and Research Center in Damascus, Syria
Synchronization source identifier, a header field in the Real-time Transport Protocol (RTP)